Haplogroup O may refer to:

 Haplogroup O-M175, a human Y-chromosome (Y-DNA) haplogroup
 Haplogroup O (mtDNA), a human mitochondrial DNA (mtDNA) haplogroup